The VII Conference of Heads of State and Government of the CPLP, commonly known as the 7th CPLP Summit (VII Cimeira da CPLP) was the 7th biennial meeting of heads of state and heads of government of the Community of Portuguese Language Countries, held in Lisbon, Portugal, on 24–25 July 2008.

Outcome
At this Summit, Senegal become the third associate member of CPLP. Senegal has a strong community of people that came from Guinea-Bissau and Cape Verde. Senegal also includes the Casamance territory that was Portuguese until the 19th century, when it was ceded to France. Even today, the people of Casamance are more linked with Guinea-Bissau than with Senegal itself and some of the citizens of the territory even want an independent Portuguese-speaking Casamance country.

Participants

Members

President Aníbal Cavaco Silva

Prime Minister Fernando da Piedade Dias dos Santos

President Luiz Inácio Lula da Silva

President Pedro Pires

President João Bernardo Vieira

Minister of Foreign Affairs Oldemiro Balói

President Fradique de Menezes

President José Ramos-Horta

Associate observers

President Teodoro Obiang Nguema Mbasogo

Representative of the Minister of Foreign Affairs Jacques Balyon

Minister of Foreign Affairs Cheikh Tidiane Gadio

Organizations
African Union
Commission Chairperson Jean Ping

References

External links
CPLP Summits official site

CPLP Summits
2000s in Lisbon